Allameh Ali Akbar Dehkhodā (1879–March 9, 1956) was a prominent Iranian linguist and lexicographer. He was the author of the Dehkhoda Dictionary, the most extensive dictionary of the Persian language published to date.

Biography
Dehkhoda was born in Tehran to parents from Qazvin. His father, Khan Baba Khan Ghazvini, died when he was only 9 years old. Dehkhoda excelled quickly in Persian literature, Arabic and French. He enrolled at the School of Political Science, which employed, amongst other figures, the Minister of Foreign Affairs and his Secretary as lecturers.

He was also active in politics, and served in the Majles as a Member of Parliament from Kerman and Tehran. He also served as Dean of Tehran School of Political Science and later the School of Law of the University of Tehran.

In 1903, he went to the Balkans as an Iranian embassy employee, but came back to Iran two years later and became involved in the Constitutional Revolution of Iran.

Dehkhoda, Mirza Jahangir Khan and Ghasem Khan published the Sur-e Esrafil newspaper for about two years, until Mohammad Ali Shah disbanded the parliament and banished Dehkhoda and some other liberals into exile in Europe. There he continued publishing articles and editorials, but when Mohammad Ali Shah was deposed in 1911, he returned to the country and became a member of the new Majlis.

He is buried in Ebn-e Babooyeh cemetery in Shahr-e Ray, near Tehran.

In his article "First Iranian Scholar who authored the Most Extensive & Comprehensive Farsi Dictionary," Manouchehr Saadat Noury wrote that,

Works

Dehkhoda translated Montesquieu's De l'esprit des lois (The Spirit of the Laws) into Persian. He has also written Amsal o Hekam ("Proverbs and Sayings") in four volumes, a French-Persian Dictionary, and other books, but his lexicographic masterpiece is Loghat-nameh-ye Dehkhoda ("Dehkhoda Dictionary"), the largest Persian dictionary ever published, in 15 volumes. Dr. Mohammad Moin accomplished Dehkhoda's unfinished volumes according to Dehkhoda's request after him. Finally the book was published after forty five years of efforts of Dehkhoda.

See also
 Dehkhoda Institute
 Iranian studies
 List of Persian poets and authors
 Persian literature

Notes

External links

 [http://www.iranicaonline.org/articles/dehkoda ALÈ-AKBAR QAZVÈNÈ Dehkhodā'] @ Encyclopaedia Iranica''
 Encyclopaedia of Islam, THREE, "Dihkhudā, ʿAlī-Akbar", John R. Perry

Iranian Iranologists
Iranian journalists
Linguists from Iran
Iranian translators
Members of the 2nd Iranian Majlis
Academic staff of the University of Tehran
Politicians from Tehran
1879 births
1956 deaths
Iranian lexicographers
Members of the Academy of Persian Language and Literature
Moderate Socialists Party politicians
19th-century Iranian writers
20th-century Iranian politicians
20th-century Iranian writers